UpperCase Media (Pty) Ltd. is a magazine publishing company headquartered in Cape Town, South Africa. The company, which was founded in 1999, publishes the South African edition of the British magazines ZOO Weekly, Heat and FHM.

In August 2008, the company merged with Media24 Ltd., publisher of City Press. Under the terms of the agreement, UpperCase Media became a wholly owned subsidiary of Media 24.

References

External links
UpperCase Media

Mass media companies of South Africa
Magazine publishing companies
Publishing companies of South Africa
Companies based in Cape Town
Mass media in Cape Town